A snake goddess is a goddess associated with a snake theme.

Examples include:
Meretseger ("She Who Loves Silence"), Egyptian snake goddess
Minoan snake goddess figurines, a type of figurine in Minoan archaeology
Renenutet, Egyptian snake goddess
Wadjet ("Green One"), Egyptian snake goddess
Nagapooshani ("She who wears snakes as her jewellery"), Sri Lankan snake goddess, is often recognized by her cobra (Shesha)

See also
Snake worship

External links